Chiretolpis melanoxantha is a moth of the family Erebidae. It is found on the Moluccas.

References

Nudariina
Moths described in 1911
Moths of Indonesia